The Sumatran long-tailed shrew (Crocidura paradoxura) is a species of mammal in the family Soricidae. It is endemic to Indonesia.

References

Mammals of Indonesia
Crocidura
Mammals described in 1886
Taxonomy articles created by Polbot